TRNAMet cytidine acetyltransferase (YpfI, TmcA) is an enzyme with systematic name acetyl-CoA:(elongator tRNAMet)-cytidine34 N4-acetyltransferase (ATP-hydrolysing). This enzyme catalyses the following chemical reaction

 [elongator tRNAMet]-cytidine34 + ATP + acetyl-CoA  CoA + [elongator tRNAMet]-N4-acetylcytidine34 + ADP + phosphate

The enzyme acetylates the wobble base C34 of the CAU anticodon of elongation-specific tRNAMet.

References

External links 
 

EC 2.3.1